The 1916–17 Irish Cup was the 37th edition of the premier knock-out cup competition in Irish football. 

Glentoran won the tournament for the 2nd time, defeating Belfast Celtic 2–0 in the final.

Results

First round

|}

Quarter-finals

|}

Replay

|}

Semi-finals

|}

Replay

|}

Final

References

External links
 Northern Ireland Cup Finals. Rec.Sport.Soccer Statistics Foundation (RSSSF)

Irish Cup seasons
1917 domestic association football cups
1916–17 in Irish association football